Camille West is an American satirical folk singer-songwriter. She was a member of Four Bitchin' Babes from 1997 to 2004. Her songs include "L.A.F.F. (Ladies Against Fanny Floss)", a protest song about bathing suits that are not designed to accommodate women's bodies; "B.O.B. (Battery Operated Boyfriend)", an ode to vibrators; "The Nervous Wreck of Edna Fitzgerald", a parody of Gordon Lightfoot's "The Wreck of the Edmund Fitzgerald"; and "Viagra in the Waters", which was voted "Funniest Song of the Year" on the Dr. Demento radio show in 2000.

West grew up in Queens.

Discography
 Suburban Mother from Hell (1992)
 Mother Tongue (1995)
 Diva's Day Off (1999)

References

External links
 

American women singers
American women songwriters
American folk musicians
Fast Folk artists
Living people
Four Bitchin' Babes members
Year of birth missing (living people)
21st-century American women